Glyptotrox kerleyi is a species of hide beetle in the subfamily Troginae.

References

Glyptotrox
Beetles described in 1996